Juan Carlos Raffo Frávega (born 30 July 1894, date of death unknown) was a Uruguayan politician. He was President of the Senate of Uruguay from March 1, 1959 to March 1, 1963. Raffo Frávega was a member of the National Party (Uruguay).

References

Profile of Juan Carlos Raffo Frávega

1894 births
Year of death missing
Presidents of the Senate of Uruguay
National Party (Uruguay) politicians